Santa Rosa de Lima Airport  is an airport serving the city of Santa Rosa de Lima in La Unión Department, El Salvador.

There is distant rising terrain south through southwest.

See also

Transport in El Salvador
List of airports in El Salvador

References

External links
 OpenStreetMap - Santa Rosa de Lima
 HERE/Nokia - Santa Rosa de Lima
 FallingRain - Santa Rosa de Lima

Airports in El Salvador
La Unión Department